Yapı Merkezi Holding A.Ş.  is a group company whose field of activity is primarily in the construction industry. It was founded in 1965 by Ersin Arioglu and Koksal Anadol in Istanbul. As the first and largest company of the Yapı Merkezi Group, Yapı Merkezi Construction and Industry has realized the design and construction of a wide variety of buildings, rail systems and heavy construction projects. Since 1980, the company has also realized contracts in countries such as Saudi Arabia,  Algeria, Morocco, the United Arab Emirates, Sudan, Ethiopia and Slovenia.

Field of Activities

Through its specialized companies, Yapı Merkezi has realized national and international projects within the fields of transportation systems, rail systems, tunnels, bridges, viaducts, industrial and general service buildings, mass housing and city planning, water collection and supply systems, restoration, strengthening, and repair works.

Group Companies 

Yapı Merkezi Prefabrication established in 1978 was the first company in its field to obtain the ISO 9001 Quality Assurance certificate in Turkey. In 1987, Yapı Merkezi has founded Freysaş in partnership with Freyssinet International. Since then Freysas has realized projects featuring advanced constructing technologies such as cable stay systems, post-tensioning, heavy lifting and ground anchorage. Yapıkonut has joined the group in 1994 and accomplished projects such as Çamkonaklar, Sokullu Estates, NP12 Estates, Sisli Plaza and the Arkeon Housing Complex. In 1995, qualified Education Institutions Inc. was founded and Irmak Schools, Education Institution were opened. In 1996, the Group has introduced SUBOR Pipe Industry Inc. to manufacture high-end technology composite construction materials.

Experience in the Rail systems

Yapıray has joined the group in 1995 in order to take the advantage of the group company’s experience in the Rail systems field and considering the increasing demand for urban and intercity railway transport. Yapıray provides design, development and operation services concerning railway systems.

Today Istanbul’s most of the operating rail systems are constructed by Yapı Merkezi. Dubai Metro, Ankara-Konya High Speed Railway, Casablanca Tramway, Algeria Bir Touta-Zeralda Railway, Medinah High Speed Train Station, Izmir Metro, Eskisehir Tramway, Kayseri Tramway, Taksim-Kabatas Funicular System and Antalya Tramway are examples of Yapı Merkezi’s turn-key projects.

2004 UITP (International Association for Public Transport) “Light Rail Project of the Year” award was given to Estram (Eskisehir LRTS), UITP “2010 Best Urban Integration Project of the Year” and British Light Transit Association’s “Worldwide Project of the Year” awards were given Kayseray (Kayseri Light Rail System). Both tramway systems are constructed by Yapı Merkezi as turnkey project.

In 2012 Yapı Merkezi Holding has established Yapı Merkezi IDIS Engineering as its technology company and developed a signaling system which it is certified as SIL 4 with its safety culture in railway. Yapı Merkezi IDIS is working for railway signaling and telecomunicatimon systems. Additionally company provides engineering services for electromechanical systems in both railway, land route and tunnels. IDIS works as design, application and system supplier. R&D in transportation technology, signaling and structural health monitoring held in this group company.

Main Works

Buildings

 Marmara Forum Shopping Center
 Sişli Plaza 
 Ankamall Shopping Center
 212 Shopping Center
 Sudan Wahat Al Khartoum Shopping Center
 Yedpa Trade Center
 Novartis Pharmaceuticals Plant
 Roche Pharmaceuticals Plant
 Frito-Lay Factory
 Denso Factory
 Işık University Campus
 Arkeon Houses
 Tuscan Valley Houses
 Sokullu Houses
 Club Aquamarine Holliday Village
 Four Seasons at the Bosphorus Hotel

Transportation Systems

Eurasia Tunnel
Dubai Metro
Ankara-Konya high-speed railway
İzmir Metro
Kabataş-Taksim Funicular
Kadıköy-Kartal Metro System
Kayseri Tramway
Eskisehir Tramway
Bursa Light Rail System
Casablanca tramway
Istanbul Metro
Istanbul nostalgic tram
Antalya Tramway
Istanbul modern tram
 San Salvador Metro
Sétif tramway
Tanzania Standard Gauge Railway
 Dar es Salaam - Morogoro
 Morogoro - Makutupora
 Managua-León-Corinto Railway
 Managua-Masaya-San Juan del Sur Railway
 Awash-Weldia Railway
Divaca-Koper high-speed railway.

Bridges

 El Mek Nimr Bridge
 Al Halfaia Bridge
Sogutlucesme and Merter Railway Bridges

Restoration

Galata Tower Restoration
The Restoration of the Historical Turkish Bastion At Algeria
Mostar Bridge Restoration at Bosnia Herzegovina
Ottoman Imperial Mint Complex Restoration
Theron Damon Mansions Restoration
Adile Sultan Palace Restoration
Restoration of Turkish Tombs in Sudan

References

External links

Construction and civil engineering companies of Turkey
Construction and civil engineering companies established in 1965
Turkish companies established in 1965